Panchal or Panchal Brahmin is a collective term for a variable range of Artisanal Indian caste groups who are Brahmins.

According to Louis Dumont, it is derived from the word panch, meaning five, and refers to communities that have traditionally worked as blacksmiths, carpenters, goldsmiths, stonemasons and coppersmith. These groups include the Lohars and Suthars  of South India. David Mandelbaum noted that the name had been assumed by the blacksmiths, carpenters, coppersmiths, goldsmiths and stonemasons of South India as a means towards achieving social upliftment, calling themselves Panchala and they are Brahmins who descend from Vishwakarma. They do, however, believe that they are equal among themselves: they perceive distinctions between their various occupational groups.

The Famous Temple of Panchal-Maa Tripura Sundari Temple which is in Umrai (Talwara),District-Banswara (Rajasthan).It is the Best Temple in Banswara.There is lakhs and lakhs of devotees come and worship to god.

References

Caste system in India